WPBA may refer to:

Women's Professional Billiard Association, officially known as the WPBA
World Peace Bell Association, a Japanese organization
World Pool-Billiard Association, incorrectly; its official acronym is WPA, to avoid confusion with the Women's Professional Billiard Association (see above), which pre-dates the WPA
WABE-TV, an Atlanta, Georgia (US) PBS member television station, which held the call sign WPBA from 1984 to 2022